Kings of Sleep is the second solo album released by bassist Stuart Hamm. It was released on June 19, 1989 on Relativity Records.

The title of the album and many of the songs were inspired by the novels and short stories of William Gibson, including Neuromancer ("Black Ice" and "Terminal Beach" are both references from that novel), Count Zero (referring to the name of the novel as well as the hacker handle of one of the protagonists), and the short story The Winter Market (Kings of Sleep is the name of a fictional stim-album in that story).

Track listing
All songs written by Stuart Hamm, except where noted.
 "Black Ice" – 4:23
 "Surely the Best" – 5:19
 "Call of the Wild" – 4:41
 "Terminal Beach" – 3:57
 "Count Zero" – 4:13
 "I Want to Know" – 5:39
 "Prelude in C" (J.S. Bach) – 2:30
 "Kings of Sleep" (Kim Bullard & Stuart Hamm) – 8:23

Personnel
 Stuart Hamm - Bass guitar
 Harry Cody - Electric Guitar on "Surely the Best", "Call of the Wild", "Count Zero" and "Kings of Sleep"
 Buzzy Feiten - Electric Guitar on "Black Ice" and "I Want to Know"
 Jonathan Mover - Drums
 Amy Knoles - Percussion
 Scott Collard - Keyboards
 Dick Zimmerman - Photography
 David Bett - Art Direction
 Stuart Hamm - Producer

References

Stuart Hamm albums
1989 albums